Athi River is a town outside Nairobi, Kenya in Machakos County. The town is named after the Athi River, which passes through. It is also known as Mavoko.

Athi River hosts the Mavoko Municipal Council and is the headquarters of Mavoko division, which is part of Machakos County. The town's population is 81,302 (2019 census), and it is still growing due to its proximity to the Kenyan capital city of Nairobi.

Metropolitan area
Athi River is part of the Greater Nairobi Metropolitan area.

History 

Athiriver also known as Mavoko was carved off the Nairobi County Council in 1963, when the latter was disbanded. Mavoko municipality has six wards (Athi River West, Katani, Kinanie/Mathani, Makadara, Muthwani and Sophia). All these wards belong to Mavoko constituency, which has a total of ten wards. The remaining four wards are within Masaku County Council.

Industry 

The town is relatively industrialised for Kenya. There are six cement factories located within the town: Bamburi Cement, Mombasa Cement, East Africa Portland Cement Company, Savannah Cement, National Cement and Athi River Mining.

The town is home to a chewing gum factory owned by the Wrigley Company.

There are also other notable companies within the town's outskirts such as Doshi Steel, Mabati Rolling Mills, Seed Co., Kapa Oil Refineries and Devki Steel.

Business 
Athi River is ambient with sprouting businesses. Some of the most notable businesses include the Coloho Mall, Crystal Rivers Safaricom Mall, Trailink Logistics and the Wattle Blossom Retreat Centre. Some of the factors influencing the rapid growth of businesses in the area include the increased real estate development in the region and the proximity to Nairobi City and mining companies.

Education 

The Daystar University has a campus in the town.

Transport 

Athi River has a railway station built in 1920 along the Uganda Railway, from Mombasa to Kisumu. There is also a new railway station on the Mombasa–Nairobi Standard Gauge Railway.

Athi River is also linked to Nairobi via the Nairobi-Mombasa Highway (commonly known as Mombasa Road), a tarmacked dual carriageway, and to nearby Kitengela by Namanga Road, a tarmacked single carriageway. Residents of Athi River are served by Routes 110 and 120 to the Nairobi CBD.

References 

 Daily Nation, 21 August 2000: Town touched by tragedy

External links 
 Mavoko Municipal Council

 
Populated places in Eastern Province (Kenya)
Athi-Galana-Sabaki River